Lainingthou Pishatao, mononymously known as Pisatao, is a primordial deity in Meitei mythology and religion. He is the god of craftsmen and architects. He is regarded as the divine personification of the ultimate reality, the abstract creative power inherent in deities, living and non living beings in the universe.
He is one of the divine manifestations of Supreme God Atingkok (Tengbanba Mapu). In many legends, he is one of the four Gods who control the four directions.

Historically, his pantheon was replaced by Vishwakarma of Hinduism. However, with the dedicated efforts of several organizations and associations including the "South East Asia Cultural Organisation" (SEACO), the status of his pantheon is reviving day by day in Manipur.

References

External links 

 https://archive.org/stream/in.ernet.dli.2015.461915/2015.461915.A-Critical_djvu.txt

Abundance deities
Abundance gods
Arts deities
Arts gods
Crafts deities
Crafts gods
Creator deities
Creator gods
Fire deities
Fire gods
Fortune deities
Fortune gods
Industry deities
Industry gods
Kings in Meitei mythology
Knowledge deities
Knowledge gods
Magic deities
Magic gods
Maintenance deities
Maintenance gods
Meitei deities
Names of God in Sanamahism
Ningthou
Smithing deities
Smithing gods
Time and fate deities
Time and fate gods
Wisdom deities
Wisdom gods